Júlíus Kemp   (born 2 December 1967) is an Icelandic film director and producer.

Biography
Kemp worked freelance in film from 1988-1990. He studied film directing at Surrey Institute of Art & Design, University College from 1990 to 1991.

He has made a number of music videos and saw them as a springboard to full-length films. His first feature film, Veggfóður: Erótísk ástarsaga (Eng. Wallpaper: An Erotic Love Story) dealt with music, words, and the lives of young people in Reykjavík in the 1990s.

Selected filmography

Director
 2009 - Reykjavik Whale Watching Massacre
 1997 - Blossi/810551
 1992 - Veggfóður: Erótísk ástarsaga

Producer
 2015 - Albatross
 2008 - Dark Floors (co-producer)
 2007 - Astrópía
 2006 - Den brysomme mannen (co-producer)
 2006 - Huldufólk 102 (associate producer)
 2005 - Strákarnir okkar
 2002 - A Man Like Me
 2000 - Íslenski draumurinn
 1997 - Blossi/810551
 1992 - Veggfóður: Erótísk ástarsaga

External links
 

Icelandic film directors
1969 births
Living people